Mount Finch is a mountain,  high, standing at the west side of the mouth of Trainer Glacier where the latter enters Trafalgar Glacier, in the Victory Mountains of Victoria Land, Antarctica. It was mapped by the United States Geological Survey from surveys and U.S. Navy air photos, 1960–64, and was named by the Advisory Committee on Antarctic Names for Lieutenant Jerry L. Finch, U.S. Navy, Squadron VX-6 project officer for infrared ice sounding equipment and an aircraft commander in Operation Deep Freeze, 1968.

References 

Mountains of Victoria Land
Borchgrevink Coast